HooGee or Haukilahden Pallo – Gäddviks Boll HooGee is a Finnish football club established in 1980. The club is based in the district of Haukilahti in the city of Espoo and specialises in youth football.  HooGee draws its membership base mainly from the Westend-Haukilahti-Niittykumpu-Tontunmäki area but others are also welcome.

The Club runs several junior teams and aims to provide boys and girls from Espoo with the opportunity to practice football. HooGee participates in the city of Espoo and the Uusimaa district's leagues, tournaments, and organises football schools, camps and various theme days.  With four men's teams in addition to the youth section, the club in total has over 800 active members.

HooGee's name stands for Haukilahti (= Hoo) followed by the Swedish counterpart Gäddvik (= Gee).

Season to season

 = current position

2010 season
HooGee M1 managed to secure a place in Nelonen after beating LePa 2–1 away in Leppävaara in their final match of the season, thus finishing 8th, after collecting 25 points in 20 matches. In the Uusimaa Cup they managed to make it to the final eight, before dropping out to Akilles from Porvoo. In the Finnish Cup they lost to NJS from Nurmijärvi 9–1 in the first round of the competition.

HooGee 2 managed to secure themselves top spot in Section 1 in Kutonen administered by the SPL Uusimaa, thus gaining themselves promotion back to [Vitonen] after only one season.

HooGee finished third in Section 1 of the Vitonen administered by the SPL Uusimaa.

HooGee 4 finished third in Section 2 of the Vitonen administered by the SPL Uusimaa.

2011 season
HooGee M1 will compete in Nelonen for the 2011 season, while the other three HooGee men's teams will compete in Vitonen.

Finnish Cup

HooGee M1 and HooGee competed in the 2011 edition of the Finnish Cup, with both teams receiving byes to the second round of the competition. HooGee M1 faced fellow Nelonen outfit Lahden Pojat JS with the team from Lahti progressing to the 3rd round after beating the home team 4–0. HooGee also bowed out of the 2011 Finnish Cup in the second round after losing 6–1 to Apollo from Hyvinkää.

The other teams
Season to Season

External links
Official website
The men's first team – HooGee M1

Football clubs in Finland
Sport in Espoo
1980 establishments in Finland
Haukilahti